Washtenaw Technical Middle College (WTMC) is a Michigan Public School Academy chartered by and located on the campus of Washtenaw Community College (WCC) in Ann Arbor, Michigan. The school allows students to obtain an associate's degree or Technical Certificate from Washtenaw Community College while earning their high school diploma.

The mission of WTMC is "to transform high school students into successful college students by providing meaningful educational choices, individualized advising, and skill-based instruction."

Graduation Statistics

References

Public high schools in Michigan
Charter schools in Michigan
1997 establishments in Michigan